Hazareh may refer to:
 Hazareh, Markazi
 Hazareh, Sistan and Baluchestan